Sefton is a small town in the Waimakariri District, New Zealand, about 23 miles from Christchurch.

In 1886, it had a census population of 276 and was a station on the Christchurch Ashley line. In 1891 it had a population of 390, of which 202 were male and 188 were female. In the 2018 census, the population was 207.

Education
Sefton has one school: Sefton School (est. 1884). It is a decile 7 state non-integrated co-educational full primary, with  students (as of  The principal is David Haythornthwaite.

Demographics
It is part of the wider Ashley-Sefton statistical area.

Sefton had a population of 207 at the 2018 New Zealand census, a decrease of 18 people (-8.0%) since the 2013 census, and a decrease of 24 people (-10.4%) since the 2006 census. There were 84 households. There were 117 males and 93 females, giving a sex ratio of 1.26 males per female. The median age was 41.2 years (compared with 37.4 years nationally), with 45 people (21.7%) aged under 15 years, 27 (13.0%) aged 15 to 29, 102 (49.3%) aged 30 to 64, and 33 (15.9%) aged 65 or older.

Ethnicities were 95.7% European/Pākehā, 5.8% Māori, 2.9% Asian, and 2.9% other ethnicities (totals add to more than 100% since people could identify with multiple ethnicities).

Although some people objected to giving their religion, 65.2% had no religion, 26.1% were Christian and 2.9% were Muslim.

Of those at least 15 years old, 21 (13.0%) people had a bachelor or higher degree, and 51 (31.5%) people had no formal qualifications. The median income was $32,600, compared with $31,800 nationally. The employment status of those at least 15 was that 78 (48.1%) people were employed full-time, 36 (22.2%) were part-time, and 3 (1.9%) were unemployed.

References

External links

Populated places in Canterbury, New Zealand
Waimakariri District